The Scottish Land Restoration League was a Georgist political party.

History
In the 1880s, enclosure was still in process in the Scottish Highlands, and resistance to it often received support from radicals around Britain and Ireland.  Branches of the Irish Land League, founded in 1879 to campaign against landlordism, had been set up in Scotland, but the League was wound up in 1883.

In 1884, Henry George toured the Highlands and major cities of Scotland on the invitation of the English Land Reform Union. Touring with Edward McHugh, he spoke on his theory of land reform. The tour culminated with a large meeting Glasgow on 18 February 1884, chaired by John Murdoch. Almost 2,000 people signed up, on the initiative of Richard McGhee, to form an organisation to propagate and campaign for George's ideas.  This group was formed as the "Scottish Land Restoration League". William Forsyth became its first President, and McHugh its first Secretary. The group immediately spread to other cities around the nation. Among those who joined were many former members of the Land League.

A second tour by George at the end of 1884 attracted less attention, and McHugh was accused of mismanaging its publicity.  Already, the League was in decline, and when it stood five candidates in the 1885 general election, they received a total of only 2,359 votes. McGhee soon assumed the Presidency of the League.

In 1888, some members, around Keir Hardie, formed the Scottish Labour Party, and ceased to work with the League. McGhee left his post in 1889, to become honorary President of the National Union of Dock Labourers. Alexander Bowman was elected as the League's new President the following year. The League merged with the Henry George Institute and the South Side Single Tax Association and renamed itself the Scottish Land Restoration Federation. Two further organisations were born of the demise of the League—the Scottish Land Restoration Union and the Scottish League for the Taxation of Land Values. Bowman left this post in 1892, but the organisation continued, with a much lower profile, renaming itself as the Scottish Single Tax League.  In 1904, it was again renamed, as the Scottish League for the Taxation of Land Values.

Election results

1885 UK general election

See also
Highland Land League

References

Henry George, Jr, The Life of Henry George: Third Period
Mairtin O'Caithain,  Fenianism, Michael Davitt and Land and Labour in Scotland
John D. Wood, Henry George's Influence on Scottish Land Reform
Graham Boyd, To Restore the Land to the People and the People to the Land: the emergence of the Not-for-Private-Profit Landownership Sector in the Highlands and Islands of Scotland

External links 
Moses : a lecture ... delivered in St. Andrew's Hall, Glasgow, December 28, 1884  Glasgow : Scottish Single Tax League

Defunct political parties in Scotland
Political parties established in 1884
Georgist parties
1884 establishments in Scotland
1904 disestablishments in Scotland
Politics of Highland (council area)
Taxation in Scotland
Defunct agrarian political parties
Land reform in Scotland
Political parties disestablished in 1904